Igor Yakimov is  a World Masters Judo champion, as well as a World Masters sport sambo champion and a medallist at the Combat Sambo world championships. He is the author of the Russian Judo video series and for his Sambo Leglocks video series.

Biography
Igor Yakimov, a former Soviet Army officer, is the head trainer of Sambo Canada and United Federation of Russian Sambo (UFRS) Canada President. Igor is a graduate of Russian Military College where he was trained in sport and combat sambo. He was twice national Sambo Champion of Russia, and world Sambo Champion. He is also the 2001 world judo champion in the Masters Class. Igor is a Master of Sports in sambo. Igor is also the Canadian representative of Federation International Amateur de Sambo (FIAS), the largest Sambo sanctioning body in the world.

When Igor came to Canada he originally lived in St. John's, Newfoundland and Labrador and trained at the Memorial University Judo Club, then run by Dr. Yves Legal.

Accomplishments
2001 World Masters Sambo Champion
2001 Medalist World Combat Sambo Championship
1999 World Masters Judo Champion
1999 Pan American Sambo Champion
1999 Pan American Sambo Champion
1998 Abu Dhabi Combat Championships Medalist
1998 Pan American Sambo Champion
1997 Provincial Judo Champion
1990 International Sambo Champion
1990 Medalist Soviet Sambo Championship
1988 Russian National Sambo Champion
1985 Russian National Sambo Champion
1984 Medalist of International Judo Tournament of Socialist Countries

Russian martial artists
Living people
Russian expatriate sportspeople in Canada
Year of birth missing (living people)